A Journey is an album by jazz musician Maciek Pysz, released in October 2015 on Dot Time Records. All tracks are composed by Pysz, except track 6, which is composed by Ralph Towner and 11 which is jointly composed and arranged by Maciek Pysz and Gianluca Corona.

Reception 
A Journey received universally favourable reviews. The critic Stephen Graham proclaimed:
 
Ian Mann said:

In London Jazz News, Adrian Pallant wrote:

Adam Baruch wrote:

Track listing 
All compositions by Maciek Pysz except track 6, "Innocente", which is by Ralph Towner and track 11 which is by Maciek Pysz and Gianluca Corona
 Fresh Look – 5:27
 Water Streets – 6:07
 I Saw You Again – 8:03
 Story Of A Story – 4:34
 Paris – 3:19
 Innocente – 4:38
 Undeniable – 8:25
 Until New Time – 4:26
 Always On The Move – 3:14
 Peacefully Waiting – 6:15
 Desert – 6:53
 Coming Home – 5:44

Personnel 
Maciek Pysz – acoustic guitar and classical guitar
Yuri Goloubev – Bass and Piano track 9
Asaf Sirkis – Drums and percussion
 Daniele di Bonaventura – bandoneon and piano
Produced and arranged by Maciek Pysz
Recorded 16–19 December 2014 at Artesuono Studios, Udine, Italy
Recorded, mixed and mastered by Stefano Amerio
Photography by Tim Dickeson and Daniel Sutka, cover photo by Jan Mika
Executive Producer Mary James
Design by MFM Media

References

Sources

2015 albums
Maciek Pysz albums